River Junction may refer to:

Places
United States
River Junction, Iowa
River Junction, Minnesota
River Junction AVA, viticultural area in California